The Seattle Chamber Music Society (SCMS) is an American organization of musicians located in Seattle, Washington that is dedicated to the performance and promotion of chamber music. Established in 1982, the presenting organization is currently in its 30th Anniversary Season. Originally the organization only presented a series of summer concerts during the month of July at the Lakeside School. However, in 1999 the organization added a series of winter concerts during the month of January at Benaroya Hall in downtown Seattle. In 2005 they expanded their summer series to include further performances during the month of August at The Overlake School in addition to the July performances.

SCMS was founded by Toby Saks, a cellist and music professor at the University of Washington, who served as artistic director until she handed over to Grammy Award-winning violinist James Ehnes about a year before her death on August 1, 2013. Ehnes had been associate artistic director since 2008, and Connie Cooper has been executive director since 1996. Recent performers with the organization include violist Cynthia Phelps, cellist Ronald Thomas, pianist Jeremy Denk, harpsichordist Byron Schenkman and violist Richard O'Neill. The Society hosts more than forty artists each season who also boast impressive careers, with the Seattle Times describing them as "the equivalent of an all-star lineup. A dream team of chamber players."

References

External links 
 

1982 establishments in Washington (state)
Chamber music groups
Non-profit organizations based in Seattle
Musical groups from Seattle
Arts organizations established in 1982